Elvis at Sun is a compact disc compilation of Elvis Presley's studio recordings at Sun Studio from 1954 to 1955, released in June 2004, BMG Heritage 61205. This set features master recordings made by Presley and his accompanists, Scotty Moore and Bill Black, occasionally augmented by other musicians, prior to his arrival on RCA Records in early 1956.

Contents
The tapes for the Sun versions of "I Got A Woman" and "Satisfied" were lost. The former would be recorded for Presley during his first RCA session. All of the studio recordings were produced by Sam Phillips, the owner of Sun Studio in Memphis, Tennessee. Phillips released Presley's recording contract to RCA for the substantial sum, in 1955 dollars, of $35,000. This gave RCA the rights to all of Presley's masters recorded at Sun.

The disc contains a slightly different track list and running order than previous issues of the Sun material, such as the Sunrise double-disc, with the shorter version of "When It Rains It Really Pours" from the fifties box, and an alternate of "I Love You Because." It still presents all eighteen Sun titles from the singer's stay at the label.

"Elvis At Sun" also was released in the vinyl LP configuration.

Importance
The set includes "That's All Right (Mama)", one of candidates for being "the first rock and roll record". Elvis' entire period at Sun is one of the seminal events in the birth of rock and roll, specifically also the beginning of the subgenre known as rockabilly. In 2001, VH1 named its parent album the 21st greatest album of all time. In 2003, the album was ranked number 11 on Rolling Stone magazine's list of the 500 greatest albums of all time. Two tracks from the Presley's Sun sessions were included in The Rock and Roll Hall of Fame's 500 Songs that Shaped Rock and Roll: "Mystery Train," and "That's All Right."

In 2002, given their importance in the development of American popular music, The Sun Sessions were chosen, by the National Recording Registry of the Library of Congress, to be kept as a bequeathal to posterity.

For more detailed information on the recording sessions, see Elvis Presley's Sun recordings.

Personnel
 Elvis Presley – vocal, guitar
 Scotty Moore – guitar
 Bill Black –  bass
 Jimmie Lott – drums on track 8
 Johnny Bernero – drums on tracks 9, 18, 19

Track listing
Chart positions for LPs and EPs from Billboard Top Pop Albums chart; positions for singles from Billboard Pop Singles chart except as indicated.

Charts

References

External links
 Sun Studio
 Sun Records

Compilation albums published posthumously
2004 compilation albums
Elvis Presley compilation albums
RCA Records compilation albums
Albums recorded at Sun Studio